The Woodburn Independent is a weekly paper published in Woodburn, Oregon, United States, and also covering the cities of Hubbard, Aurora, Donald, Gervais, St. Paul and Mt. Angel, and the surrounding area of Marion County. The Independent was founded in 1888. It is published on Wednesdays by Pamplin Media Group and has a circulation of 3,313.  In 1999, Saturday editions were added, but the bi-weekly publication ceased on August 31, 2011, and the paper reverted to Wednesday-only issues.

History
The paper was established by Leonard H. McMahan on December 1, 1888. According to the newspaper's staff , the paper preceded the incorporation of Woodburn by about 9 months, and initially read more like a gossip sheet than a news source. McMahan went on to become a member of the Oregon House of Representatives during the 1923 Legislature, and a Marion County Circuit Judge from 1924–1943. His former home in Salem is listed on the National Register of Historic Places as the David McCully House. In January 2013, the paper was sold to the Pamplin Media Group along with five other papers owned by Eagle Newspapers. The Independent sued the city of Salem when the city denied access to records of a 2017 arrest for child abuse. The newspaper lost the initial case, but won on appeal in September 2018.

References

External links

Information on Leonard Harl McMahan from Marion County Pioneer Cemeteries
Historic images relating to L. H. McMahan from the Salem Public Library

Woodburn, Oregon
1888 establishments in Oregon
Newspapers published by Pamplin Media Group
Oregon Newspaper Publishers Association
Publications established in 1888
Newspapers published in Oregon